The Clandestine Marriages Act 1753, also called the Marriage Act 1753, long title "An Act for the Better Preventing of Clandestine Marriage", popularly known as Lord Hardwicke's Marriage Act (citation 26 Geo. II. c. 33), was the first statutory legislation in England and Wales to require a formal ceremony of marriage. It came into force on 25 March 1754. The Act contributed to a dispute about the validity of a Scottish marriage, although pressure to address the problem of irregular marriages had been growing for some time.

Background
Before the Act, the legal requirements for a valid marriage in England and Wales had been governed by the canon law of the Church of England. This had stipulated that banns should be called or a marriage licence obtained before a marriage could take place and that the marriage should be celebrated in the parish where at least one of the parties was resident. However, these requirements were directory rather than mandatory and the absence of banns or a licence – or even the fact that the marriage was not celebrated in a church – did not render the marriage void. The only indispensable requirement was that the marriage be celebrated by an Anglican clergyman. The mistaken assumption that a simple exchange of consent would suffice is based on later conflations between the theological position that consent made a marriage and the actual practice of the church courts. Prior to the passage of the 1753 Act such an exchange only created a binding contract to marry rather than a legal marriage.

Effects
The Act tightened the existing ecclesiastical rules regarding marriage, providing that for a marriage to be valid it had to be performed in a church and after the publication of banns or the obtaining of a licence. Those under the age of 21 had to have parental consent if they married by licence; marriages by banns, by contrast, were valid as long as the parent of the minor did not actually forbid the banns. Jews and Quakers were exempted from its provisions, although the Act did not go so far as to declare such marriages valid and it was many years before their legal standing was assured. Nor did the Act apply to members of the British Royal Family. Indeed, members of the Royal Family have been consistently exempted from all general legislation relating to marriage since this date, which is why doubts were expressed in 2005 about the ability of King Charles III to marry Camilla Parker-Bowles in a civil ceremony, civil marriage being the creation of statute law. It was also provided that the 1753 Act had no application to marriages celebrated overseas or in Scotland.

The Act was highly successful in its stated aim of putting a stop to clandestine marriages, i.e., valid marriages performed by an Anglican clergyman but not in accordance with the canons. Thus the notorious practice of clandestine Fleet Marriages associated with London's Fleet Prison was ended, although there were various short-lived and abortive attempts to claim exemption for the Savoy Chapel in the Strand and the parish of Temple in Cornwall. The early death of the Savoy's minister on board ship while waiting to be transported for his flouting of the Act may have discouraged others from making similar claims, even if his demise was due to gout rather than to the conditions of his imprisonment.

However, some couples evaded the Act by travelling to Scotland. Various Scottish "Border Villages" (Coldstream Bridge, Lamberton, Mordington and Paxton Toll) became known as places to marry. And in the 1770s the construction of a toll road passing through the hitherto obscure village of Graitney led to Gretna Green becoming synonymous with romantic elopements.

A similar traffic to the Isle of Man also sprang up, and in 1757 the Legislature of the Island  passed An Act to prevent Clandestine Marriages  in very similar terms to the English Act of 1753. But the Manx Act differed in one significant respect from the latter, in requiring clergy from abroad, who were convicted of conducting marriages in breach of the Act's requirements, to be pilloried and have their ears cropped, before being imprisoned, fined and deported. The Act was repealed in 1849.

Modern misinterpretation

Modern commentators, after the work of historians such as Lawrence Stone and Stephen Parker, have often misconstrued both the requirements of the Act and the canon-law requirements which directly preceded it. It has been widely but wrongly asserted, for example, that the Act rendered invalid any marriage involving minors, i.e. those under 21, unless parental consent had been given. In fact, this was true only for the minority of marriages celebrated by licence.

While the parent of a minor could forbid the banns and so prevent a marriage from going ahead, a marriage by banns that took place without active parental dissent was valid. This gave rise to the practice whereby underage couples would resort to a parish where they were not resident to have the banns called without their parents' knowledge. Since the Act specifically prohibited the courts from inquiring into the parties' place of residence after the marriage had been celebrated, such evasive marriages were still valid. The only way in which an aggrieved parent could challenge such a marriage was if there had been a mistake amounting to fraud in the calling of the banns.

It has also been mistakenly asserted that the Act abolished common-law marriage, along with informal folk-practices such as handfasting or broomstick weddings. However, since neither the name nor concept of "common-law marriage" existed in England and Wales at this time, this can be shown to be untrue, while recent scholarship has argued that ideas such as handfasting and "broomstick weddings" are the result of Victorian
folk-lore and late 20th-century New Age mythology.

See also
Marriage Act
Marriage Act 1836

References

Further reading
 The text of the Act

External links
Civil Marriage in the Catholic Encyclopedia
Why do people get married after having children? BBC News online 2011-05-26

Great Britain Acts of Parliament 1753
Marriage, unions and partnerships in England
1753 in England
Marriage law in the United Kingdom